This is a chronological list of baseball players from the United States Virgin Islands who played in Major League Baseball between 1957 and 2017

Players

Resource
Baseball Reference

Virgin Islands
Virgin Islands